Saldo is a surname that may refer to:

Surname 
 Frank Saldo, stage name of Frank Harold Woollaston (1882–1939), an early bodybuilder, brother of Monte Saldo.
 Monte Saldo, stage name of Alfred Montague Woollaston (1879–1949), an early bodybuilder, brother of Frank Saldo.
 Volodymyr Saldo (born 1956), a Russian and Ukrainian politician who has served since 26 April 2022 as the head of the collaborationist Kherson military–civilian administration in Russian-occupied Ukraine.